Video Hustler (ビデオ・ハスラ一 Bideo Hasurā) is a pool (pocket billiards) arcade video game released by Konami in 1981. Dynamo released the game under the name Lil' Hustler.

The gameplay is basically Billiards; but with numbered, color-coded pucks on top of a lacquered plywood-made, green board. (Similar to Carrom)

Reception 
In Japan, Game Machine listed Video Hustler on their June 1, 1983 issue as being the twenty-fourth most-successful table arcade unit of the month.

References

External links
 
 Video Hustler at Arcade History

1981 video games
Arcade video games
Arcade-only video games
Cue sports video games
Konami games
Konami arcade games
Video games developed in Japan